Soviet women played an important role in World War II (whose Eastern Front was known as the Great Patriotic War in the Soviet Union). While most toiled in industry, transport, agriculture and other civilian roles, working double shifts to free up enlisted men to fight and increase military production, a sizable number of women served in the army. The majority were in medical units.

There were 800,000 women who served in the Soviet Armed Forces during the war, which is roughly 5 percent of total military personnel. The number of women in the Soviet military in 1943 was 348,309, 473,040 in 1944, and then 463,503 in 1945. Of the medical personnel in the Red Army, 40% of paramedics, 43% of surgeons, 46% of doctors, 57% of medical assistants, and 100% of nurses were women. Nearly 200,000 were decorated and 89 of them eventually received the Soviet Union's highest award, the Hero of the Soviet Union, among which some served as pilots, snipers, machine gunners, tank crew members and partisans, as well as in auxiliary roles.

At first, when Germany attacked the Soviet Union on June 22, 1941, thousands of women who volunteered were turned away. However, after massive losses in the face of Operation Barbarossa, attitudes had to be changed, ensuring a greater role for women who wanted to fight. In the early stages of the war, the fastest route to advancement in the military for women was service in medical and auxiliary units.

Air crew 

For Soviet women aviators, instrumental to this change was Marina Raskova, a famous Soviet aviator, occasionally referred to as the "Russian Amelia Earhart". Raskova became famous as both a pilot and a navigator in the 1930s. She was the first woman to become a navigator in the Red Air Force in 1933. A year later she started teaching at the Zhukovsky Air Academy, also a first for a woman. When World War II broke out, there were numerous women who had training as pilots and many immediately volunteered. While there were no formal restrictions on women serving in combat roles, their applications tended to be blocked, run through red tape, etc. for as long as possible in order to discourage them from seeing combat. Raskova is credited with using her personal connections with Joseph Stalin to convince the military to form three combat regiments for women. Not only would the women be pilots, but the support staff and engineers for these regiments were women. Although all three regiments had been planned to have women exclusively, only the 588th would remain an all-women regiment. The Soviet Union was the first nation to allow women pilots to fly combat missions. These regiments with strength of almost a hundred airwomen, flew a combined total of more than 30,000 combat sorties, produced at least twenty Heroes of the Soviet Union, and included two fighter aces. This military unit was initially called Aviation Group 122 while the three regiments received training. After their training, the three regiments received their formal designations as follows:

The 586th Fighter Aviation Regiment: This unit was the first to take part in combat (April 16, 1942) of the three female regiments and take part in 4,419 combat missions (125 air battles and 38 kills). Lydia Litvyak and Yekaterina Budanova were assigned to the unit before joining the 437th IAP in the fighting over Stalingrad and became the world's only two female fighter aces (with 5 each, although soviet propaganda claims 12 and 11 victories respectively), both flying the Yak-1 fighter.

The 46th Taman Guards Night Bomber Aviation Regiment: This was the best known of the regiments and was commanded by Yevdokiya Bershanskaya. It originally began service as the 588th Night Bomber Regiment, but was redesignated in February 1943 as recognition for service which would tally almost 24,000 combat missions by the end of the war. Their aircraft was the Polikarpov Po-2, an outdated biplane. The Germans were the ones however who gave them the name that they are most well known as, The Night Witches.

The 125th Guards Bomber Aviation Regiment: Marina Raskova commanded this unit until her death in combat, and then the unit was assigned to Valentin Markov. It started service as the 587th Bomber Aviation Regiment until it was given the Guards designation in September 1943.

Infantry

The Soviet Union deployed women as snipers and in a variety of infantry roles. Between 1941 and 1945, a total of 2,484 soviet female snipers were functioning in this role, of whom about 500 survived the war. Their combined tally of kill claims is at least 11,000. The most famous snipers during the war included Lyudmila Pavlichenko and Roza Shanina.

Women frequently served as medics and communication personnel, as well – in small numbers – as machine gunners, political officers, tank drivers, and in other parts of the infantry. Manshuk Mametova was a machine gunner from Kazakhstan and was the first Asian woman to receive the title Hero of the Soviet Union. Mariya Oktyabrskaya and Aleksandra Samusenko were tank drivers. Tatyana Kostyrina had over 120 kills and commanded an infantry battalion in 1943 following the death of her commander. Before its dissolution in 1944, the 1st Separate Women's Volunteer Rifle Brigade deployed thousands of women in a variety of combat roles.

Women crewed the majority of the anti-aircraft batteries employed in Stalingrad. Some batteries, including the 1077th Anti-Aircraft Regiment, also engaged in ground combat.

In response to the high casualties suffered by male soldiers, Stalin allowed planning which would replace men with women in second lines of defense, such as anti-aircraft guns and medical aid. These provided gateways through which women could gradually become involved in combat. For example, women comprised 43% of physicians, who were sometimes required to carry rifles as they retrieved men from firing zones. Through small opportunities like this, women gradually gained credibility in the military, eventually numbering 500,000 at any given time toward the end of the war.

Partisans

Women consistituted significant numbers of the Soviet partisans. One of the most famous was Zoya Kosmodemyanskaya. In October 1941, still an 18-year-old high school student in Moscow, she volunteered for a partisan unit. At the village of Obukhovo near Naro-Fominsk, Kosmodemyanskaya and other partisans crossed the front line and entered territory occupied by the Germans. She was arrested by the Nazis on a combat assignment near the village of Petrischevo (Moscow Oblast) in late November 1941. Kosmodemyanskaya was savagely tortured and humiliated, but did not give away the names of her comrades or her real name (claiming that it was Tanya). She was hanged on November 29, 1941. It was claimed that before her death Kosmodemyanskaya had made a speech with the closing words, "There are two hundred million of us; you can't hang us all!" Kosmodemyanskaya was the first woman to become Hero of the Soviet Union during the war (February 16, 1942).

The youngest woman to become a Hero of the Soviet Union was also a resistance fighter, Zinaida Portnova. In January 1944, she was captured. She shot one of her captors whilst trying to escape but was caught and killed, just short of her 18th birthday. In 1958, Portnova was posthumously made a Hero of the Soviet Union, there is a monument to her in the city of Minsk and some youth pioneer movement detachments were named after her.

See also

Women in the Russian and Soviet military
Women in the Russian Revolution
Women in Russia

References

Bibliography
 
 Bergman, Jay. "Valerii Chkalov: Soviet Pilot as New Soviet Man," Journal of Contemporary History 33#1 (1998), pp. 135–152
 Campbell, D'Ann. "Women in Combat: The World War Two Experience in the United States, Great Britain, Germany, and the Soviet Union" Journal of Military History (April 1993), 57:301–323.
  Cottam, K. Jean, ed. The Golden-Tressed Soldier (Manhattan, KS, Military Affairs/Aerospace Historian Publishing, 1983) on Soviet women
  Cottam, K. Jean. Soviet Airwomen in Combat in World War II (Manhattan, KS: Military Affairs/Aerospace Historian Publishing, 1983)
  Cottam, K. Jean. "Soviet Women in Combat in World War II: The Ground Forces and the Navy," International Journal of Women's Studies, 3, no. 4 (1980): 345–57
 Eglitis, Daina, and Vita Zelče. "Unruly actors: Latvian women of the Red Army in post-war historical memory." Nationalities Papers (2013) 41#6 pp: 987–1007.
 Engel, B. Alpern. "'The Womanly Face of War': Soviet Women Remember World War II" in N. N. Dombrowski, ed.) Women and War in the Twentieth Century: Enlisted with or without Consent, (Garland Publishing Inc., 1998)
 Erickson, J. "Soviet women at War" in J. Garrard and C. Garrard, eds., World War II and the Soviet People (St Martin's Press, 2002)
 Harris, Adrienne M. "After A Youth on Fire: The Woman Veteran in Iulia Drunina's Postwar Poetry." Aspasia (2013) 7#1 pp: 68–91.
 Jug, Steven G. "Red Army romance: Preserving masculine hegemony in mixed gender combat units, 1943–1944." Journal of War & Culture Studies 5#3 (2012): 321–334.
 Krylova, Anna. Soviet Women in Combat: A History of Violence on the Eastern Front (2010) excerpt and text search
 Krylova, Anna. "Stalinist Identity from the Viewpoint of Gender: Rearing a Generation of Professionally Violent Women‐Fighters in 1930s Stalinist Russia." Gender & History 16#3 (2004): 626–653.
 Markwick, Roger D., and Euridice Charon Cardona. Soviet Women on the Frontline in the Second World War (Palgrave Macmillan, 2012)
 
 Pennington, Reina. Wings, Women, and War: Soviet Airwomen in World War II Combat  (2007)  excerpt and text search 
 Pennington, Reina. "Offensive Women: Women in Combat in the Red Army in the Second World War" Journal of Military History (2010) 74#3 pp 775–820, with full bibliography
 Reese, Roger R. Why Stalin's Soldiers Fought: The Red Army's Military Effectiveness in World War II (2011), ch 11–12 on women in the army.
 Stoff, Laurie. They Fought for the Motherland: Russia's Women Soldiers in World War I and the Revolution (University Press of Kansas, 2006)
 Strebe, Amy Goodpaster. Flying for Her Country: The American and Soviet Women Military Pilots of World War II (Praeger Security International, 2007).
 Timofeeva-Egorova, Anna. Over Fields of Fire: Flying the Sturmovik in Action on the Eastern Front, 1942–45 (Helion & Company, 2010).
 Timofeeva-Egorova, Anna. Red Sky, Black Death: A Soviet Woman Pilot's Memoir of the Eastern Front (Slavica Publishers, 2009).
 Yenne, Bill. The White Rose of Stalingrad: The Real-Life Adventure of Lidiya Vladimirovna Litvyak, the Highest Scoring Female Air Ace of All Time (Osprey Publishing, 2013).

External links

 Call for contributors – Issue 17 (Autumn 2015) – "Women in Arms: from the Russian Empire to Post-Soviet States"
 Soviet and Red Army Women in World War II: a documentary by StalData

 
 
Women's rights in the Soviet Union
 
 Women
 Women
 
Women soldiers